Sang-cheol or Sang-chul, also spelled Sang-chol in North Korea, is a Korean masculine given name. It was the 10th-most popular name for newborn boys in South Korea in 1950. Its meaning differs based on the hanja used to write each syllable of the name. There are 35 hanja with the reading "sang" and 11 hanja with the reading "chul" on the South Korean government's official list of hanja which may be used in given names.

People with this name include:

Sportspeople
Lee Sang-cheol (born 1935), South Korean long distance runner
Seo Sang-cheol (judoka) (born 1944), South Korean judo practitioner
Sang Chul Lee (taekwondo) (born 1948), American taekwondo practitioner of Korean descent
Yoon Sang-chul (born 1965), South Korean football forward
Yoo Sang-chul (1971–2021), South Korean football manager
Park Sang-cheol (born 1984), South Korean football goalkeeper
Ri Sang-chol (born 1990), North Korean football midfielder

Other
Sang Chul Lee (1924–2017), United Church of Canada leader
Suh Sang-chul (1935–1983), South Korean economist, educator and administrator
Chin Sang-chol, North Korean politician; see 2014 North Korean parliamentary election

See also
List of Korean given names

References

Korean masculine given names